The 2010 British Rowing Championships were the 39th edition of the National Championships, held from 16–18 July 2010 at the Strathclyde Country Park in Motherwell, North Lanarkshire. They were organised and sanctioned by British Rowing, and are open to British rowers.

The 2010 regatta was notable by the very poor turn out by the country's top clubs, especially in the elite men's events. The men's coxed fours had only three entries, two of which withdrew before the final, leaving London Rowing Club to row over. The same crew also won the men's coxless fours, and the men's open eights which was a straight final, where London combined with four members of the clubs lightweight squad.

Senior

Medal summary

Lightweight

Medal summary

U 23

Medal summary

Junior

Medal summary 

Key

References 

British Rowing Championships
British Rowing Championships
British Rowing Championships